The Filesystem Hierarchy Standard (FHS) is a reference describing the conventions used for the layout of a UNIX system. It has been made popular by its use in Linux distributions, but it is used by other UNIX variants as well. It is maintained by the Linux Foundation. The latest version is 3.0, released on 3 June 2015.

Directory structure

In the FHS, all files and directories appear under the root directory /, even if they are stored on different physical or virtual devices. Some of these directories only exist on a particular system if certain subsystems, such as the X Window System, are installed.

Most of these directories exist in all Unix-like operating systems and are generally used in much the same way; however, the descriptions here are those used specifically for the FHS and are not considered authoritative for platforms other than Linux.

FHS compliance 
Most Linux distributions follow the Filesystem Hierarchy Standard and declare it their own policy to maintain FHS compliance. GoboLinux and NixOS provide examples of intentionally non-compliant filesystem implementations.

Some distributions generally follow the standard but deviate from it in some areas. The FHS is a "trailing standard", and so documents common practices at a point in time. Of course, times change, and distribution goals and needs call for experimentation. Some common deviations include:
 Modern Linux distributions include a /sys directory as a virtual filesystem (sysfs, comparable to /proc, which is a procfs), which stores and allows modification of the devices connected to the system, whereas many traditional Unix-like operating systems use /sys as a symbolic link to the kernel source tree.
 Many modern Unix-like systems (like FreeBSD via its ports system) install third-party packages into /usr/local, while keeping code considered part of the operating system in /usr.
 Some Linux distributions no longer differentiate between /lib and /usr/lib and have /lib symlinked to /usr/lib.
 Some Linux distributions no longer differentiate between /bin and /usr/bin and between /sbin and /usr/sbin. They may symlink /bin to /usr/bin and /sbin to /usr/sbin. Other distributions choose to consolidate all four, symlinking them to /usr/bin.

Modern Linux distributions include a /run directory as a temporary filesystem (tmpfs), which stores volatile runtime data, following the FHS version 3.0. According to the FHS version 2.3, such data were stored in /var/run, but this was a problem in some cases because this directory is not always available at early boot. As a result, these programs have had to resort to trickery, such as using /dev/.udev, /dev/.mdadm, /dev/.systemd or /dev/.mount directories, even though the device directory is not intended for such data. Among other advantages, this makes the system easier to use normally with the root filesystem mounted read-only.
For example, below are the changes Debian made in its 2013 Wheezy release:
 /dev/.* → /run/*
 /dev/shm → /run/shm
 /dev/shm/* → /run/*
 /etc/* (writeable files) → /run/* 
 /lib/init/rw → /run
 /var/lock → /run/lock
 /var/run → /run
 /tmp → /run/tmp

History 
FHS was created as the FSSTND (short for "Filesystem Standard"), largely based on similar standards for other Unix-like operating systems. Notable examples are these: the  description of file system layout, which has existed since the release of Version 7 Unix (in 1979); the SunOS  and its successor, the Solaris .

Release history

See also 
Hierarchical file system
Unix directory structure
XDG Base Directory Specification

Notes

References

External links
 
 Full specification texts
 objectroot – a proposal for a new filesystem hierarchy, based on object-oriented design principles
 The Dotted Standard Filename Hierarchy, yet another very different hierarchy (used in cLIeNUX) (mirror)
 

Computer standards
 
Linux
System administration
Unix file system technology